Yuriy Ovcharov is a retired Soviet and Ukrainian football player.

Career
A pupil of Luhansk football. From 1984 to 1988 he played for Desna Chernihiv in the Ukrainian Second League. In 1989 he moved to Kosonsoy, where he became a silver medalist of the second league in 1990 (zone 9). In 1991 he returned to Desna Chernihiv. The first match in the championship of Ukraine was played on May 3, 1992 in the 13th round of the Ukrainian First League against Sumy "Motorist" (1: 2). In the fall of 1993 he played for Polissya Zhytomyr.

In 1994 he became a player of Stal Alchevsk. For two seasons as a member of the Kirovograd team he won a bronze medal of the Ukrainian Second League (1993/94) and a gold medal of the first league (1994/95). He spent the 1995/96 season at Alchevsk Steel, which took 3rd place in the Ukrainian First League. In 1996 he returned to Zirka Kropyvnytskyi. He made his debut in the major leagues on September 15, 1996 in a match against Dnipro (0: 4).

In 1997 he returned to Chernihiv. In 14 games of the 1996/97 championship, in which Desna Chernihiv took first place in Group "A" of the Ukrainian Second League, missed 1 goal. In 1999 he played for Polissya Zhytomyr, in 2002-2003 he was a player for Desna.

Coach career
After the end of the player's career in 2003, he got a position in the coaching staff of Desna Chernihiv. In 2008 he was included in the team's application for the position of goalkeeper. In the summer of 2009, during 6 rounds of the Ukrainian championship, he acted as head coach due to the fact that Desna Chernihiv did not sign a contract with Oleksandr Ryabokon. According to the results of the 2009–10 season, "Desna" took 8th place in the Ukrainian First League, but was excluded from the PFL. Yuriy Ovcharov together with head coach Oleksandr Ryabokon transferred to Lviv. From 2011 he worked as a coach of Bukovyna goalkeepers.  In the summer of 2012 he returned to Desna Chernihiv.

Honours
Zirka Kropyvnytskyi
 Ukrainian Second League: 1993–94

References

External links 
 Profile on Official website of FC Desna Chernihiv
 
 Yuriy Ovcharov allplayers.in.ua

1966 births
Living people
Soviet footballers
FC Desna Chernihiv players
FC Zirka Kropyvnytskyi players
FC Stal Alchevsk players
FC Polissya Zhytomyr players
FC Desna Chernihiv managers
Ukrainian Premier League players
Association footballers not categorized by position